Kappa Capricorni (κ Cap, κ Capricorni) is a solitary star in the constellation Capricornus. It is visible to the naked eye with an apparent visual magnitude of +4.73. Based upon an annual parallax shift of 11.09 mas as seen from the Earth, the star is located about 294 light years from the Sun.

This is a yellow-hued, evolved, G-type giant star with a stellar classification of G8 III. There is a 91% probability that it is currently on the horizontal branch, rather than the red giant branch. As such, it is a red clump giant with an estimated 2.43 times the mass of the Sun and has expanded to 13.28 times the radius of the Sun. The star is about 1.2 billion years old and has a projected rotational velocity that is too small to be measured. It radiates 107 times the solar luminosity from its photosphere at an effective temperature of 5,096 K.

References

G-type giants
Capricorni, Kappa
Capricornus (constellation)
Durchmusterung objects
Capricorni, 43
206453
107188
8288